Admiral Sir Henry Harwood Harwood, KCB, OBE (19 January 1888 – 9 June 1950), was a British naval officer who won fame in the Battle of the River Plate.

Early life
Following education at Stubbington House School, Harwood entered the Royal Navy in 1904 and specialised in torpedoes. He served in the First World War. In 1919, he served on the battleship ), 1st Battle Squadron. By 1929 he had been promoted to captain and become the commanding officer of the destroyer  and Senior Officer of the 9th Destroyer Division.

In 1931 and 1932, Harwood attended the Imperial Defence College. Upon completion of the course in March 1932, he became flag captain of the heavy cruiser  whilst at the same time serving as Chief Staff Officer to the Rear-Admiral Commanding the 1st Cruiser Squadron. From July 1934 until 1936, Harwood served on the staff of the Royal Naval War College at Greenwich.

In September 1936, Harwood was appointed commodore and given command of the South American Division of the America and West Indies Station, whilst at the same time serving as commanding officer of the cruiser . At the outbreak of the Second World War, command of HMS Exeter passed to Captain F. S. Bell.

Second World War
He flew his broad pennant in Ajax as his flagship.

Harwood suspected that Graf Spee would try to strike next at the merchant shipping off the River Plate estuary. With Cumberland being absent for repairs, Harwood deployed his other three cruisers off the estuary on 12 December. In the ensuing Battle of the River Plate on 13 December, Harwood's cruisers were damaged, but so was Graf Spee, which fled to Montevideo in neutral Uruguay. She was scuttled there a few days later. For this action, Harwood was promoted to rear admiral and knighted.

From December 1940 to April 1942, Rear-Admiral Harwood served as a Lord Commissioner of the Admiralty and Assistant Chief of Naval Staff. The command was later split, and he became Commander-in-Chief, Levant, in February 1943, with responsibility for flank support and seaborne supply of the British Eighth Army.

In April 1944, Harwood became Admiral Commanding, Orkneys and Shetlands. He retired on 15 August 1945 with the rank of admiral, having been declared medically unfit for further duty.

Post-war
Sir Henry Harwood died in Goring-on-Thames in 1950. Harwood Avenue, the main thoroughfare in the town of Ajax, Ontario, was named after him. In the 1956 film, The Battle of the River Plate, Harwood was played by Anthony Quayle.

Ranks

Decorations

References

External links

|-

|-

1888 births
1950 deaths
Academics of the Royal Naval College, Greenwich
Graduates of the Royal College of Defence Studies
Burials in Oxfordshire
Royal Navy admirals of World War II
Knights Commander of the Order of the Bath
Lords of the Admiralty
Officers of the Order of the British Empire
Recipients of the War Cross (Greece)
Royal Navy officers of World War I
People educated at Stubbington House School
Admiralty personnel of World War II
Military personnel from London